Christ Crucified may refer to:
Christ Crucified (Goya), a 1780 painting by Francisco de Goya
Christ Crucified (Velázquez), a 1632 painting by Diego Velázquez
American Gospel: Christ Crucified, 2019 documentary film

See also
 Crucifixion (disambiguation)